The ashy-headed babbler (Pellorneum cinereiceps) is a species of bird in the ground babbler family Pellorneidae. The species is also known as the ashy-crowned babbler. The species is closely related to the short-tailed babbler. The two species are sometimes treated as the same species but differ in their calls. The species is monotypic, meaning it has no subspecies.

Distribution and habitat
It is endemic to Palawan in the Philippines. The species is non-migratory. The species is listed as least concern.

Description
The upperparts, upperwing and tail are ochre-brown, the throat, breast and belly are white with an narrow ochre wash across the breast and along the flanks. The legs are pinkish and the bill is grey above and pink below. The sexes are the same. The calls include a nasal jhieu-jhieu-jhieu-jhieu.

Behaviour
The behaviour of this species is poorly known. Nothing is known about its diet, but it is assumed to eat small invertebrates. It feeds singly or in pairs and close to the ground, in a manner very similar to the short-tailed babbler. It is inquisitive and flicks its wings while foraging.

The breeding season of the ashy-headed babbler is between April and September. They nest on the ground at the base of rattan (a type of climbing palm); the nest is a cup of grasses, rattan fibres and bamboo leaves, lined with lichens and moss. Two eggs are laid, which can be white with red or brown spots or blue with dark brown speckles.

References

ashy-headed babbler
Birds of Palawan
ashy-headed babbler
Taxonomy articles created by Polbot
Taxobox binomials not recognized by IUCN